San Sebastián is a city in the state of Aragua in Venezuela. It is the shire town of the San Sebastián Municipality. It is twinned with Sanlúcar de Barrameda in Spain.

External links

Cities in Aragua
Populated places established in 1585